The Dasam Granth (Gurmukhi: ਦਸਮ ਗ੍ਰੰਥ dasama gratha) is a collection of various manuscripts in Sikhism containing compositions attributed to Guru Gobind Singh. Guru Gobind Singh ordained the sacred text Guru Granth Sahib as his successor, eternally ending the line of human Gurus. It is the primary holy scripture of the Sikhs and regarded by Sikhs as the living embodiment of Ten Gurus. Bachittar Natak is a part of ("Dasam Granth") composition

The standard edition of the text contains 1,428 pages with 17,293 verses in 18 sections. These are set in the form of hymns and poems mostly in the Braj language (Old western Hindi), with some parts in Avadhi, Punjabi, Hindi and Persian. The script is written almost entirely in Gurmukhi, except for the Guru Gobind Singh's letters to Aurangzeb—Zafarnama and the Hikaaitaan—written in the Persian alphabet.

The Dasam Granth contains hymns, from Hindu texts, which are a retelling of the feminine in the form of goddess Durga, an autobiography, letter to the Mughal emperor Aurangzeb, as well as reverential discussion of warriors and theology. The scripture was recited in full within Nirmala Sikhs in the contemporary era. Parts of it are popularly retold from Hindu Puranas, for the benefit of the common man, who had no access to Hindu texts of the time. Compositions of the Dasam Granth include Jaap Sahib, Tav-Prasad Savaiye and Kabiyo Baach Benti Chaupai which are part of the Nitnem or daily prayers and also part of the Amrit Sanchar or initiation ceremony of Khalsa Sikhs.

Zafarnama and Hikayats in a different style and format appended to it in the mid 18th century. Other manuscripts are said to include the Patna bir and the  Mani Singh Vali bir all originated in mid to late 18th century. These manuscripts include the writings that are questioned by most Sikhs in the contemporary era, such as the Ugradanti and Bhagauti Astotar.

Authorship 
Although the compositions of the Dasam Granth are traditionally accepted to be written by Guru Gobind Singh, there have been questions of the authenticity of the entirety of Dasam Granth from time of compilation. There are three major views on the authorship of the Dasam Granth:
 The traditional view is that the entire work was composed by Guru Gobind Singh himself.
 The entire collection was compiled by the poets in the Guru's entourage.
 Only a part of the work was composed by the Guru, while the rest was composed by the other poets.

In his religious court at Paonta Sahib and Anandpur Guru Gobind Singh had employed 52 poets, who translated several classical texts into Braj Bhasha. Most of the writing compiled at Paonta Sahib was lost while the Guru's camp was crossing the Sirsa river before the Battle of Chamkaur in 1704. There were copiers available at the Guru's place who made several copies of the writings, and other writings may have been included too which may have led to authenticity issues. Later, Bhai Mani Singh compiled all the available works under the title Dasam Granth.

The traditional scholars claim that all the works in Dasam Granth were composed by the Guru himself, on the basis of Bhai Mani Singh's letter. But the veracity of the letter has been examined by scholars and found to be unreliable. An example of varying style can be seen in the sections 'Chandi Charitar' and 'Bhagauti ki War'

Historical writings 

The following are historical books after the demise of Guru Gobind Singh which mention that the compositions in the present Dasam Granth was written by Guru Gobind Singh:
 Rehitnama Bhai Nand Lal mentioned Jaap Sahib is an important Bani for a Sikh.
 Rehitnama Chaupa Singh Chibber quotes various lines from Bachitar Natak, 33 Swiayey, Chopai Sahib, Jaap Sahib.
 In 1711, Sri Gur Sobha was written by the poet Senapat and mentioned a conversation of Guru Gobind Singh and Akal Purakh, and written three of its Adhyay on base of Bachitar Natak.
 In 1741, Parchian Srvadas Kian quoted lines from Rama Avtar, 33 Swaiyey and mentioned Zafarnama with Hikayats.
 in 1751, Gurbilas Patshahi 10 – Koyar Singh Kalal, mentioned Guru Gobind Singh composed Bachitar Natak, Krisna Avtar, Bisan Avtar, Akal Ustat, Jaap Sahib, Zafarnama, Hikayats etc. This is first Granth mentioned Guruship of Guru Granth Shahib.
 In 1766, Kesar Singh Chibber in Bansavalinama writes that Guru Gobind Singh ordered the Guru Granth Sahib and Dasam Granth be kept separate. Kesar Singh frequently quotes Ugardanti, Bachitar Natak, Khalsa Mehima and many other compositions.
 In 1766, Sri Guru Mahima Parkash – Sarup Chand Bhalla, mentioned about various Banis of Guru Gobind Singh and compilation of Dasam Granth
 In 1790, Guru Kian Sakhian – Svarup Singh Kashish, mentioned Guru Gobind Singh composed, Bachitar Natak, Krishna Avtar, Shastarnaam Mala, 33 Swaiyey etc.
 In 1797, Gurbilas Patshahi 10 – Sukkha Singh, mentioned compositions of Guru Gobind Singh.
 In 1812, J. B. Malcolm, in SKetch of Sikhs mentioned about Dasam Granth as Bani of Guru Gobind Singh.

Structure 
The standard print edition of the Dasam Granth, since 1902, has 1,428 pages.

The standard official edition contains 17,293 verses in 18 sections. These are set in the form of hymns and poems mostly in the Braj Bhasha (Old western Hindi), with some parts in Avadhi, Punjabi, Hindi and Persian language. The script is almost entirely the Gurmukhi script except for the letter of the Sikh Guru to Aurangzeb – Zafarnama, and the Hikayat in the Persian script.

Contents 
The Dasam Granth has many sections covering a wide range of topics:

Ugardanti 
Ugardanti is a poetic composition said to be written by Guru Gobind Singh, after the creation of the Khalsa Panth at Anandpur Sahib. The composition is present in Dasam Granth Bir Patna Sahib. The bani contains information about the creation of the Khalsa Panth, the dress code of the Sikhs, and is strictly against ritualism.

Etymologically, Ugardanti is a feminine term made of two words, Ugar means Fierce and Danti means Tooth. One having Fierce Tooth, is called Ugardanti. Guru Gobind Singh Ji invokes Adi Shakti in the form of the Fierce Toothed Ugardanti, writing various attributes of Ugardanti and asking for blessings and protection for the prosperity of the new Panth which is free from hypocrisy, ritualism, casteism, human worship and worships only One Non-Dual God.

In Bansavalinama Dasan Patshahian ka (1769), the author Kesar Singh Chibbar explains and quotes a few passages from Guru Gobind Singh's Ugardanti.

In Hum Hindu Nahi(1898 ), the author Bhai Kahn Singh Nabha, believed that Ugardanti Bani was not written by Guru Gobind Singh but by Bhai Sukha Singh, a priest at Patna. However, Sukha Singh's works came into being after the Bansavalinama of Kesar Singh Chibbar.

Nihang and Namdhari Sikhs believe it to be written by Guru Gobind Singh and is part of their daily liturgy. It was and is read to inspire warriors to stand up for truth and righteousness in the face of tyranny and oppression. The Composition is divided into six verses called Chhands in which the syllables and the rhythm are arranged in a precisely controlled pattern. The Type of Chhandd used is Bhagvati Chhand.

Tav-Prasad Savaiye 
Tav-Prasad Savaiye (pronunciation: , lit. ‘exclusively you, in war song meter’) is a short composition of 10 stanzas which is part of daily liturgy among Sikhs (Nitnem). It was penned down by Guru Gobind Singh and is part of his composition Akal Ustat (The praise of God). This is an important composition which is read during Amrit Sanchar. This Bani appears in the Dasam Granth on pages 13 to 15, starting from Stanza 21 of Akal Ustat.

Tavprasad means with thy grace. This composition strongly rejects idolatry, pilgrimages, grave worshiping, samadhis of yogis and other ritualistic beliefs of Hinduism, Jainism and Islam as being of no use in attaining God if performed without the love of God and all his creation . It is included in Nitnem, the daily morning prayers of Sikhs, and recited after completing Jaap Sahib. It starts with Sravag Sudh Samuh Sidhan Ke and goes up to Koor Kriya Urjheo Sab Hi Jag. Among many famous quotes from Tav-Prasad Savaiye, "Jin Prem Kiyo Tin Hi Prabhu Paayo" is widely quoted by different scholars of different religions. In Dialogues on Universal Responsibility and Education, the Dalai Lama quoted it while giving lessons on love.

Tav-Prasad Savaiye is very important part of the Nitnem. Among other things Nitnem works as a shield for the Khalsa (Khalsa is a perfect human being, which is the vision of Guru Gobind Singh  by the orders of Akal Purkh. Such a human is perfectly capable of defending himself and others from the attacks of enemy(both spiritual and temporal)). Specifically Savaiye act as a shield against the attacks of Pride, Ignorance, Hatred, Hypocrisy and Delusions.

Role in Sikh liturgy, access 
The compositions within Dasam Granth play a huge role in Sikh liturgy, which is prescribed by Sikh Rehat Maryada:
 Jaap Sahib is part of Nitnem, which Sikh recites daily in morning.
 Tav-Prasad Savaiye, again a bani of Nitnem, is part of Akal Ustat composition, which is recited daily in morning along with above.
 Benti Chaupai, is part of Sri Charitropakhyan, which is recited in morning as well as evening prayers.
 Jaap, Tav Prasad Savaiye and Chaupai are read while preparing Khande Batey Ki Pahul for Khalsa initiation.
 The first stanza of the Sikh ardās is from Chandi di Var.
 As per Sikh Rehat Maryada, a stanza of Chaubis Avtar, "pae gahe jab te tumre", should be comprised in So Dar Rehras.

In the Nihang tradition – considered heretical by the Khalsa Sikhs, the Dasam Granth is given equal scriptural status as the Adi Granth (first volume). Chandi di Var is also an important prayer among Nihang and Namdhari Sikhs.

Except for the liturgical portions and some cherrypicked verses of the Dasam Granth that are widely shared and used, few Sikhs have read the complete Dasam Granth or know its contents. Most do not have access to it in its entirety, as the generic printed or translated versions do not include all its sections and verses. In its history, the entire text was in the active possession of the Khalsa soldiers.

Manuscripts 

The oldest known manuscript of Dasam Granth is likely the Anandpuri bir. It is dated to the 1690s, but a few folio pages on Zafarnama and Hikayats were definitely added later, because they are composed after 1700, are in a different style and format, lacking the folio numbers present on all pages elsewhere. These letters of Guru Gobind Singh were likely appended to it in the early 18th century. According to another view, the earliest surviving manuscript of the complete text is dated to 1713, and the early manuscript versions have minor variations.

Other important manuscripts include the Patna bir (1698 CE) found in Bihar, and the Mani Singh Vali bir (1713) found in Punjab. The Mani Singh bir includes hymns of the Banno version of the Adi Granth. It is also unique in that it presents the Zafarnama and Hikayats in both Perso-Arabic Nastaliq script and the Gurmukhi script. The Bhai Mani Singh manuscript of Dasam Granth has been dated to 1721, was produced with the support of Mata Sundari, states Gobind Mansukhani.

The early Anandpuri, Patna and Mani Singh manuscripts include writing that are disputed in the contemporary era, as well as sections such as the Ugradanti and Sri Bhagauti Astotra that were, for some reason, removed from these manuscripts in the official versions of Dasam Granth in the 20th century by Singh Sabha Movement activists.

According to the Indologist Wendy Doniger, many orthodox Sikhs credit the authorship and compilation of the earliest Dasam Granth manuscript to Guru Gobind Singh directly, while other Sikhs and some scholars consider the text to have been authored and compiled partly by him and partly by many poets in his court at Anandpur.

Prior to 1902, there were numerous incomplete portions of manuscripts of Dasam Granth in circulation within the Sikh community along with the complete, but somewhat variant, major versions such as the Anandpuri and Patna birs. In 1885, during the Singh Sabha Movement, an organization called the Gurmat Granth Pracharak Sabha was founded by Sikhs to study the Sikh literature. This organization, with a request from Amritsar Singh Sabha, established the Sodhak Committee in 1897. The members of this committee studied 32 manuscripts of Dasam Granth from different parts of the Indian subcontinent. The committee deleted some hymns found in the different old manuscripts of the text, merged the others and thus created a 1,428-page version thereafter called the standard edition of the Dasam Granth. The standard edition was first published in 1902. It is this version that has predominantly been distributed to scholars and studied in and outside India. However, the prestige of the Dasam Granth was well established in the Sikh community during the Sikh Empire, as noted in 1812 by colonial-era scholar Malcolm. According to Robin Rinehart – a scholar of Sikhism and Sikh literature, modern copies of the Dasam Granth in Punjabi, and its English translations, often do not include the entire standard edition text and do not follow the same ordering either.

Other compilations

Das Granthi
Das Granthi (ਦਸ ਗ੍ਰੰਥੀ) is a small religious booklet containing only few selected compositions from Dasam Granth. Das stands for Ten and Granthi stands for booklet. It means Booklet of 10th Guru of Sikhism. This booklet was created for beginners and lay readers for reading these compositions in daily liturgy for proper understanding.

There is no standardization of this booklet and various sects in Sikhism have their own versions. The Shiromani Gurdwara Parbandhak Committee contains eight texts namely, Jaap, Bachitra Natak, Chandi Charitra I, Shabad Hazare Patshahi 10, Akal Ustati, Chandi Charitra 2, Gian Prabodh and Chandi di Var.

See also 
 History of Dasam Granth
Sarbloh Granth
Guru Gobind Singh
Guru Granth Sahib

Notes

References

External links

Related to Dasam Granth
Dasam Granth website
Debating the Dasam Granth, Christopher Shackle (2012)
Framing the Dasam Granth Debate: Throwing the Baby with the Bath Water, Pashaura Singh (2015)
Presence and Absence: Constructions of Gender in Dasam Granth Exegesis, Robin Rinehart (2019)
Read Ugardanti & Translation Online
Sri Dasam Granth Sahib: Questions and Answers: The book on Sri Dasam Granth Sahib
Tav Prasad Savaiye Bani in Punjabi
Tav Prasad Savaiye Bani in Hindi

Related to Dasam Granth 
Exegesis on Bachitar Natak on dasamgranth.in
Manuscripts of Dasam Granth
Hemkunt
Analysis of Bichitra Natak

 
Indian religious texts
Sikh scripture
18th-century manuscripts